Para badminton at the 2021 Asian Youth Para Games was held at Bahrain from 2 to 6 December.

Medal table

Medalists

Singles

Doubles

References

External links 
 Full Results
 https://bwfpara.tournamentsoftware.com/tournament/CD02931B-0D77-49F4-B884-49AA642F66F3

Asian Youth Para Games
2021 Asian Youth Para Games
Badminton in Bahrain